Swing Me an Old Song is an LP album by Julie London, released by Liberty Records under catalog numbers LRP-3119 (monaural) and LST-7119 (stereophonic) in 1959. The accompaniment was by Jimmy Rowles and his Orchestra.

Track listing

Personnel
Julie London – vocals
Jack Sheldon - trumpet
Jimmy Rowles - piano, arranger, conductor
Al Viola - guitar

References

Liberty Records albums
1959 albums
Julie London albums
Albums produced by Bobby Troup